Fulmine was the name of at least three ships of the Italian Navy and may refer to:

 , a destroyer launched in 1898 and discarded in 1921.
 , a  launched in 1931 and sunk in 1941.
 , a patrol boat launched in 1955 as Sentinella and renamed in 1965. She was retired in 1970.

Italian Navy ship names